Matthew Frank Leonetti A.S.C. (born July 31, 1941) is an American cinematographer. Accomplished and highly prolific, he has worked on dozens of well-known and acclaimed films spanning numerous genres, including Poltergeist, Fast Times at Ridgemont High, Weird Science, Jagged Edge, Strange Days, and Star Trek: First Contact. He has collaborated with directors such as Tobe Hooper,  Walter Hill, John Hughes, Kenneth Branagh, Kathryn Bigelow, Zack Snyder, and The Farrelly Brothers.

Life and career 
Leonetti was born in Los Angeles, California in 1941. His father Frank was a filmmaker and cinematographer who served as a gaffer and lighting technician on low-budget B-movies like The Violent Years, Frankenstein's Daughter, and Beyond the Time Barrier. Leonetti began his career working on a number of projects with his father, serving as a camera operator on films like Adam at 6 A.M. and The Organization. He soon fell in with Jerry Jameson, a prolific television director who dabbled in feature films. His debut as cinematographer was The Bat People, a horror B-movie directed by Jameson and starring Stewart Moss and Michael Pataki, on which he also served as an executive producer. Though the film came and went with little fanfare, it did gain a minor cult following years later after being featured on an episode Mystery Science Theater 3000. Leonetti spent much of the 1970s shooting made-for-television films directed by Jameson.

In 1979, Leonetti shot his first big-budget theatrical film in the form of the Academy Award-winning Breaking Away, directed by Peter Yates. Three years later, he shot the Academy Award-nominated Poltergeist, where he was responsible for creating many of the film's iconic images. This proved to be his big break, and in the following years he quickly became one of the most prolific and accomplished DPs in the film industry, shooting films like Fast Times at Ridgemont High, Weird Science, Commando, and Jagged Edge. In 1987, he began a collaboration with director Walter Hill, which would continue of the course of several films into the 1990s. Throughout that decade, he would work with directors like Kenneth Branagh, Kathryn Bigelow, and William Dear. His work on the cult science fiction noir Strange Days earned him a nomination for Best Cinematography from the Chicago Film Critics Association. He shot two entries in the Star Trek film franchise, and served as DP on his brother John R. Leonetti's directorial debut, Mortal Kombat: Annihilation.

In the early 2000s, Leonetti shot a string of blockbuster thriller and action films; including Along Came a Spider, 2 Fast 2 Furious, Rush Hour 2, and The Butterfly Effect. He shot the 2004 remake of Dawn of the Dead, which served as the feature film debut of director Zack Snyder. Since 2006, he has mostly worked on comedy films, many of which are directed by the Farrelly Brothers. In 2015, he was the recipient of a Special Honor Prize, the President's Award, from the American Society of Cinematographers.

Personal life 
Leonetti has a younger brother, John, who is himself a prolific cinematographer and occasional film director. He is a graduate of Loyola Marymount University.

Filmography

Film 

Additional photography

Television

Literature 
 Kay Weniger: Das große Personenlexikon des Films, Band 4, Page 690, Berlin (2001)

References

External links

1941 births
Living people
American cinematographers
American people of Italian descent
Artists from Los Angeles
Loyola Marymount University alumni